Majnu or Majnun or Majnoon (in Arabic) may refer to:

People
Qays Ibn al-Mulawwah (645–688), better known as Majnun, Arab bedouin poet, basis of the love story of Layla and Majnun
Majnun Gorakhpuri (1904–1988), Urdu poet
Majnu Shah (d. 1787), Indian freedom fighter
Shams al Faransi, subject of the Arabic love story Marwa and al-Majnun al-Faransi

Films
Films based on or inspired by or titled after the poet and the love story:
Majnu (1987 film), 1987 Indian Telugu-language film starring Akkineni Nagarjuna and Rajani
Majunu, 2001 Indian Tamil-language film by Ravichandran
Majnu, 2016 Indian Telugu-language film starring Nani
Majnun (film), 2016 Uzbek film
Mr. Majnu, 2019 Indian Telugu-language romantic comedy film by Venky Atluri
Mission Majnu, 2023 Indian spy-thriller film by Shantanu Bagchi

Places
Majnun, Iran (disambiguation)
Majnu-ka-tilla, neighborhood in North Delhi, India
Majnoon Island, Iraq
Majnoon oil field

See also
Layla and Majnun (disambiguation)
Junoon (disambiguation), Arabic for being possessed by the jinn
Jinn (disambiguation)